Sycamore Strip Airport  is a public airport located eight miles (12.9 km) southwest of the central business district (CBD) of Fort Worth, in Tarrant County, Texas, United States. It is owned by a local flight school, A & W Aircraft.

The airport, which has a paved runway, is used solely for general aviation purposes including aircraft rental and flight school.

More information available at the airport's website.

Facilities 
Sycamore Strip Airport has one runway:
 Runway 17/35: 3,373 x 30 ft. (1,028 x 9 m), Surface: Concrete with an elevation of 760 feet.

References

External links 

Airports in Fort Worth, Texas
Airports in Tarrant County, Texas